The Fiji national cricket team is the men's team that represents Fiji in international cricket. Fiji has been an associate member of the International Cricket Council (ICC) since 1965, although the team's history goes back to the late 19th century.

In April 2018, the ICC decided to grant full Twenty20 International (T20I) status to all its members. Therefore, all Twenty20 matches played between Fiji and other ICC members since 1 January 2019 have been a full T20I.

History

Early days

Cricket was introduced to Fiji by European settlers in 1874, and the native population began taking up the game in 1878. The governor of Fiji at the time listed introducing cricket to the native Fijians as one of the achievements of his tenure in his memoirs.

Early tours

Fiji was playing first-class cricket just 21 years after cricket was introduced to the country, when they toured New Zealand in early 1895.

1895 tour of New Zealand

Fiji's team on the tour in 1895 was captained by John Udal, whose great-grandson Shaun would eventually play Test cricket for England. The first match of the tour was a two-day match against Auckland, which Fiji lost by an innings.

A low scoring second match against Otago was drawn after rain washed out the first of the two days. The third match against Canterbury was also lost by an innings, before a draw against Wellington.

The final two matches of the tour went much better for the Fijians, winning against Hawke's Bay by an innings after a century from John Collins, and beating Taranaki by two wickets.

1907–08 tour of Australia

In 1907–08, Fiji toured Australia, playing 26 matches against state, university and district sides between 11 December 1907 and 30 March 1908. In the drawn two-day match against Queensland, Pope Cakobau took 7 for 105 and 3 for 56. The Fijian team also played a two-day match against New South Wales and two against Victoria. All four of these matches were drawn.

1923–24 New Zealand tour of Fiji
A New Zealand team captained by Walter Harvie, and consisting mostly of players from Auckland, toured Fiji in March and April 1924, playing five matches, including two three-day matches against Fiji. None of the matches were first-class.

1935–36 New Zealand tour of Fiji
A young New Zealand team captained by Bruce Massey, known as the Maorilanders, toured Fiji in December 1935 and January 1936, playing nine matches, including two three-day matches against Fiji. None of the matches were first-class.

Post War period

Fiji toured New Zealand twice more, in 1948 and 1954. Fiji's first match against a Test-playing nation came in 1956, when the West Indies visited. Fiji won the match against a team featuring the likes of Garfield Sobers by 28 runs despite being bowled out for 91, largely thanks to a six wicket haul from John Gosling.

1948 tour of New Zealand

Like the tour in 1895, the 1948 tour started with a defeat to Auckland, by 168 runs. Fiji won their next match against Wellington by one wicket, before losing to Canterbury by 36 runs.

The tour continued with a 46 run defeat by Otago and concluded with a 115 run win against Auckland. One notable player for Fiji on this tour was IL Bula, who scored the most runs and the only century on the tour. Bula's full name is Ilikena Lasarusa Talebulamainavaleniveivakabulaimainakulalakebalau, and his name is thought to be the longest of any first class cricketer.

1954 tour of New Zealand

Just four matches were played on the 1954 tour, which started with a two wicket defeat to Otago. The tour continued with another two wicket defeat, this time to Canterbury, before a 117 run defeat to Wellington. The tour ended with a seven wicket win against Auckland. The team included Ratu Kamisese Mara who would go on to become the Prime Minister and President of Fiji.

1983–84 England visit to Fiji
An England XI played two limited-over matches against the Fiji Cricket Association President's XI in 1984. Basically this was the full England squad of the day on its way to tour New Zealand. The England side won both matches although they were given a serious scare in the second, the Fijian side losing by only 18 runs.

ICC membership

Fiji gained associate membership of the ICC in 1965. They played in the first ICC Trophy tournament in 1979, and played in every one until 2001. They also played in the first ACC Trophy in 1996, losing in the semi-final to the UAE.

In 2001, Fiji played in the first Pacifica Cup in Auckland, reaching the final where they lost to the New Zealand Māori by three wickets. They played in the 2002 tournament in Samoa, finishing third after beating the Cook Islands in a play-off.

In 2003, Fiji hosted the South Pacific Games. The cricket tournament saw the hosts lose to Papua New Guinea in the final. The following year, they took part in the EAP Challenge in Fuji City, Japan, winning after beating Tonga in the final. This qualified them for the repêchage tournament for the 2005 ICC Trophy. At that tournament in Kuala Lumpur, Malaysia, they reached the final, where they lost to Papua New Guinea by 30 runs, thus missing out on the 2005 ICC Trophy.

In 2006, Fiji played in the 2006 ICC EAP Cricket Trophy in Brisbane, Australia. They won the tournament winning all of their matches against the Cook Islands and Japan, qualifying them for Division Three of the World Cricket League in Darwin, Australia. They warmed up for the tournament with a three match series at home against Vanuatu, winning all three matches, but were unsuccessful in the tournament itself, losing all five games they played, thus meaning they will have to take part in Division Four in 2008.

Later in 2007, they took part in the cricket tournament at the 2007 South Pacific Games, losing to Papua New Guinea in the final group game, meaning that they went home with the silver medal.

Fiji took part in the 2010 ICC World Cricket League Division Five in Nepal, where they finished sixth and last and in doing so failed to win a single match in the tournament. Fiji then played in the 2011 ICC World Cricket League Division Six and finished sixth and last and in doing so were relegated to 2013 ICC World Cricket League Division Seven.

Tournament history

World Cricket League 
 2007: Division Three – 8th place
 2008: Division Four – 5th place
 2010: Division Five – 6th place
 2011: Division Six – 6th place
 2013: Division Seven – 3rd place
 2015: Division Six – 5th place

ICC Trophy 

1979: First round
1982: First round
1986: First round
1990: Plate competition
1994: Plate competition
1997: 11th place
2001: First round
2005: Did not qualify

ACC Trophy 

1996: Semi-finals

South Pacific Games 
1979: Bronze medal
1987: Silver medal
1991: Silver medal
2003: Silver medal
2007: Silver medal
2011: Silver medal

ICC T20 World Cup East Asia-Pacific Qualifier
2018-19: 4th place (Group A Subregional Qualifier)
2022-23: TBC (Group A Subregional Qualifier)

Records 
International Match Summary — Fiji
 
Last updated 18 March 2023

Twenty20 International 
T20I record versus other nations

Records complete to T20I #2029. Last updated 18 March 2023.

Other records
For a list of selected international matches played by Fiji, see Cricket Archive.

Players

Fiji's most famous player is Neil Maxwell, who played first-class cricket for New South Wales and Victoria in Australia, and for Canterbury in New Zealand in addition to representing Australia A. Nat Uluiviti is the other Fijian to have played first-class cricket for a team other than Fiji, playing for Auckland in the 1950s.

Current squad 

The Fiji  squad at the 2015 ICC World Cricket League Division Six tournament was as follows:

 Josefa Rika (c)
 Metuisela Beitaki
 Sakiusa Dokosobau
 Imran Khan
 Riyad Khan
 Jikoi Kida
 Karan Kumar
 Kunaal Kumar
 Rabici Lesuma
 Viliame Manakitoga
 Sekove Ravoka
 Giles Smith
 Jone Wesele
 Viliame Yabaki

See also
 List of Fiji Twenty20 International cricketers
 Fiji women's national cricket team

References

External links 
 Cricket Fiji
 Fiji Cricket at ESPN Cricinfo

1895 establishments in Fiji
Cricket in Fiji
National cricket teams
Cricket
Fiji in international cricket